The sooty dunnart (Sminthopsis fuliginosus) is a species of dunnart found in Western Australia. It is one of the least-known of the dunnarts, with the IUCN classifying it as data deficient. It was formerly believed to be a subspecies of the common dunnart (S. murina).

References

Dasyuromorphs
Mammals of Western Australia
Marsupials of Australia
Mammals described in 1852
Taxobox binomials not recognized by IUCN